Sebastian Mwansa (born 21 September 1988) is a Zambian football winger who currently plays for Nkwazi F.C.

References

1988 births
Living people
Zambian footballers
Zambia international footballers
Green Buffaloes F.C. players
TP Mazembe players
Power Dynamos F.C. players
Nkwazi F.C. players
Association football wingers
Zambian expatriate footballers
Expatriate footballers in the Democratic Republic of the Congo
Zambian expatriate sportspeople in the Democratic Republic of the Congo